The 2012–13 Duquesne Dukes men's basketball team represented Duquesne University during the 2012–13 NCAA Division I men's basketball season. The Dukes, led by first year head coach Jim Ferry, played their home games at the A. J. Palumbo Center and were members of the Atlantic 10 Conference. They finished the season 8–22, 1–15 in A-10 play to finish in last place. They failed to qualify for the Atlantic 10 tournament.

Roster

Schedule

|-
!colspan=12| Exhibition

|-
!colspan=12| Regular season

References

Duquesne Dukes Men's
Duquesne Dukes men's basketball seasons
2012 in sports in Pennsylvania
2013 in sports in Pennsylvania